Unter St. Veit  is a metro station on  of the Vienna U-Bahn. It is located in the Hietzing District. It opened in 1981.

References

Buildings and structures in Hietzing
Railway stations opened in 1981
1981 establishments in Austria
Vienna U-Bahn stations
Railway stations in Austria opened in the 20th century